Walter Cole was an American politician from New York.

He was a member of the New York State Assembly (Jefferson Co.) in 1823 and 1831.

References

People from Jefferson County, New York
Members of the New York State Assembly
Year of birth missing
Year of death missing